Giovanni Pietro Perti or Peretti (1648 – 1714) was an Italian Baroque sculptor and architect, regarded as one of the leading European sculptors on the verge of the 18th century. He has been an elder of Šnipiškės and Antakalnis suburbs governed by Sapiehas.

Living in Canton Ticino, Perti, as a sculptor of comasco school, was influenced by an Italian master Gian Lorenzo Bernini. Educated in Florence and invited to Vilnius by Michał Kazimierz Pac, Perti has spent most of his life in the capital of the Grand Duchy of Lithuania working for magnate families. He became famous for the stucco decorations of St. Peter and St. Paul's Church (1677–82), considered the Lithuanian Baroque masterpiece. He worked together with Giovanni Maria Galli who added the ornamentations around sculptures by Perti. Perti served in the manor of the Grand Hetman of Lithuania Jan Kazimierz Sapieha the Younger from 1689 until 1701

During his career Perti has designed, constructed and decorated some of most prominent Lithuanian Baroque monuments in Vilnius: Slushko Palace (1690), Sapieha Palace (1691) and the Church of The Saviour with the Trinitarian monastery (started in 1691, decorated 17–1705), all situated in Antakalnis; he reconstructed the interior and designed the stucco of the altar of the Chapel of St. Casimir in Vilnius Cathedral (1686–88). Perti has also participated in the decoration of the Pažaislis Monastery ensemble in Kaunas, together with Joan Merli and Michelangelo Palloni whose daughter Maria Magdalena he was married to.

References

Sources

 

1648 births
1714 deaths
Italian Baroque sculptors
Lithuanian sculptors
Italian male sculptors
17th-century Italian sculptors
18th-century Italian sculptors
Italian Baroque architects
18th-century Italian male artists